City Hall, also known as the Municipal Building, is a historic municipal building in New Bern, Craven County, North Carolina. It was originally built in 1897 by the federal government to house a post office, federal courthouse, and custom house. It is a 3 1/2-story, brick and granite building with a 2 1/2-story wing in the Romanesque Revival style. The building has hipped roofs with dormers. The Baxter Clock, a clock tower, is in the square outside. It became the municipal building in 1936.

It was listed on the National Register of Historic Places in 1973.

References

City and town halls on the National Register of Historic Places in North Carolina
Romanesque Revival architecture in North Carolina
Government buildings completed in 1897
Buildings and structures in New Bern, North Carolina
National Register of Historic Places in Craven County, North Carolina
City and town halls in North Carolina
1897 establishments in North Carolina